The Tracy Press is a weekly newspaper published in Tracy, California, United States. Established in 1898 by William Paul Friedrich 
the Tracy Press was operated by the Matthews family from 1943 to 2012. The Tracy Press is now co-published by Will Fleet and Ralph Alldredge, who purchased the newspaper and took over publication Nov. 12, 2012, under the name Tank Town Media. It remains one of the few family-owned newspapers still in existence in California. , the paper has an average weekly circulation of over 10,000 and covers both *Tracy, California and Mountain House.

Will Fleet and Ralph Alldredge are co-publishers. In 1999, publisher emeritus Samuel H. Matthews was given the Philip N. McCombs Achievement Award by the California Press Association.

Leading up to the 2006 U.S. Congressional Election, Tracy Press articles and editorials were widely discussed in state and national news and opinion forums, from the Democratic Congressional Campaign Committee to Amy Ridenour's National Center for Public Policy Research blog, due to the Press being the hometown newspaper of the embattled United States Representative Richard Pombo. The Tracy Press-sponsored forum held October 6, 2006 turned out to be the only time that Pombo and challenger Jerry McNerney faced voters on the same stage after Pombo declined debate invitations from groups such as the League of Women Voters.

In 2010, the newspaper scaled back publication to a weekly schedule. The paper is published on Fridays, and current news is available every day at  www.tracypress.com, with frequent updates on Facebook.

In 2010, the Tracy Press received an award for its coverage of the Sandra Cantu kidnapping and murder case. Press photo editor and reporter Glenn Moore has also been honored several times by the California Newspaper Publishers Association for his news, sports and feature photographs, and former editor Jon Mendelson received similar CNPA awards for his columns, which appeared in the opinion and sometimes news sections of the paper.

Freedom of information

The Tracy Press filed a California Public Records Act request in 2007, seeking copies of e-mails sent from the personal e-mail account of Tracy Vice Mayor Suzanne Tucker.  The e-mails were sent to Lawrence Livermore National Laboratory officials and concerned the manner in which a public forum about a research lab would be conducted.  Since the e-mails were about city business, attorneys for the Tracy Press argued that copies should be made available to the public.

A San Joaquin County Superior Court judge ruled against the Tracy Press, saying that since the e-mails were created and kept on Tucker's personal computer, and were never used, owned, possessed or sent by the City, they are not public records.

The Tracy Press appealed the ruling and the California Court of Appeal (3rd District) ruled in favor of the City of Tracy on procedural grounds.

Other publications
In addition to the Tracy Press, Tank Town Media also publishes the Patterson Irrigator in Patterson.

References

External links
Official Tracy Press website
The Cal Press

Weekly newspapers published in California
Mass media in San Joaquin County, California
Tracy, California
Publications established in 1898
1898 establishments in California
Freedom of information in the United States